Queen Sinseong of the Gyeongju Gim clan or formally called as Grand Queen Mother Sinseong was a Silla royal family member as the first cousin of King Gyeongsun who became the fifth wife of Taejo of Goryeo and the mother of Anjong of Goryeo, also the grandmother of Hyeonjong of Goryeo which she later posthumously honoured as queen in 1010 under his command.

Biography

Marriage
In November 935, when King Gyeongsun expressed his intention to surrendered Silla to Goryeo, Taejo sent an envoy in return this request.
Taejo also wanted to married with Silla's royal member and Gyeongsun said:
"Our Uncle, Gim Eok-ryeom has a daughter that both of her virtue and appearance are beautiful."
"우리 백부(伯父), 김억렴(金億廉)에게 딸이 있어 덕(德)과 용모가 쌍미(雙美)한지라 이가 아니면 내정(內政)을 구비(具備)할 수 없을 것." 

After this, Gyeongsun sent his older first cousin, Lady Gim (김씨) to Goryeo and become the 5th wife of Taejo.

Paternal ancestors
Queen Sinseong was the 5th descendant of King Munseong (문성왕) and the daughter of Gim Eok-ryeom (김억렴) who was the uncle of King Gyeongsun (경순왕) that makes she become King Gyeongsun's older cousin.

References

External links
Queen Sinseong on Doosan Encyclopedia .
Queen Sinseong on Naver .
Queen Sinseong on Encykorea .

Year of birth unknown
Date of birth unknown
Year of death unknown
Date of death unknown
Consorts of Taejo of Goryeo
Silla people